The LD&ECR Class D was a class of nine 0-6-4T steam locomotives supplied to the Lancashire, Derbyshire and East Coast Railway in 1904 and 1906 by Kitson & Co. of Leeds. They later became the property of the Great Central Railway and finally the London and North Eastern Railway, upon which they were known as Class M1.

History
The Lancashire, Derbyshire and East Coast Railway (LD&ECR) was a line whose primary business was carrying coal from the mines in northern Derbyshire and northern Nottinghamshire to places such as Lincoln for onward shipment by other railways. Accordingly, the LD&ECR needed powerful locomotives capable of hauling these heavy trains.

In March 1903, Kitson & Co., the Leeds locomotive builders, were asked to quote for three 0-8-0 tender locomotives; at the time, they were building the first three of the Class 8A 0-8-0s for the GCR. This order was cancelled in April 1903 because the Grimsby line was unsuitable for such locomotives. The LD&ECR Locomotive Superintendent, Robert A. Thom, therefore prepared a design for a tank locomotive larger than Class A, and as with all previous LD&ECR locomotives, they were built by Kitson & Co. They were not much more powerful than Class A, the main differences being an increased coal and water capacity. This necessitated the use of an additional carrying axle at the rear, giving the 0-6-4T wheel arrangement. The initial order comprised six locomotives, which were delivered in May and June 1904, and they formed Class D on the LD&ECR. Proving satisfactory, a further three were ordered, again from Kitsons; but by the time that they were delivered in December 1906, the LD&ECR was in the middle of negotiations with the GCR which would lead to the LD&ECR being taken over by the GCR at the start of 1907; these three were paid for by the GCR. There were some detail differences between these and the first six: in particular, they were fitted with water scoops so that, on suitably equipped routes, the tanks could be replenished without stopping.

Initially they were based at Tuxford, but by 1921, four of them had been sent to the LD&ECR's other depot at Langwith Junction. They performed well on the coal trains for which they had been designed; a typical load from Langwith Junction to Grimsby was 45 coal wagons and a brake van, totalling . After the GCR takeover, more were required; and the opportunity was taken to update the design. Thom assisted John G. Robinson, the GCR's Locomotive Superintendent, in preparing the design of a new 2-6-4T which appeared in 1914 as GCR Class 1B.

Numbering
The first six locomotives, delivered in May and June 1904, were given LD&ECR numbers 29–34. The last three, delivered in December 1906, were numbered A1 to A3. After the LD&ECR was absorbed by the Great Central Railway (GCR) on 1 January 1907, they were given GCR numbers 1148–53 and 1145–47 respectively. During 1924 and 1925, the LNER increased the GCR numbers by 5000. Five survived to be allotted new numbers in 1943, but only one was actually renumbered; 6151 became 9082 in May 1946.

Withdrawal
Withdrawal commenced in 1939 when no. 6152 was withdrawn in February, followed by 6149 in December. The others followed at intervals, the last to be withdrawn being 9082 in July 1947. None have been preserved.

Notes

References

Further reading

D
0-6-4T locomotives
Kitson locomotives
Railway locomotives introduced in 1904
Scrapped locomotives
Standard gauge steam locomotives of Great Britain
Freight locomotives